Viriato Díaz Pérez (1875 – August 25, 1958) was a Spanish-born writer who later migrated to Paraguay.

Childhood and Youth

Viritao Díaz Pérez was born 1875, in Madrid. Nicolás Díaz Pérez, his father, was a writer who authored the Diccionario Biográfico y Bibliográfico de Extremeños Ilustres (Biographic and Bibliographic Dictionary of Illustrious People of Extremadura). His mother, Emilia Martín de la Herrería, was also a writer.

In 1900, Díaz Pérez was awarded a Doctor in Philosophy and Letters by the Complutense University of Madrid, where he was taught by Marcelino Menéndez y Pelayo, Francisco Giner de los Ríos, and Moraita y Cordera.

Career in Madrid

From a young age he contributed in Hispanic magazines, along with other writers of the generation of 98. Prior to his arrival in Paraguay in 1895, Díaz Pérez had already published many articles and essays on his specialisations. Some of these were, 

 La India
 Some data about the Ancient Hindu Literature *Nature and Function of the rhythmical language, thesis presented in the Philosophy and Letters Faculty of the University of Madrid.
 About Muslim mysticism
 Supernaturismo – Karma
 The root “an” and its meanings, thesis presented to the Congress of Orientalistas, in Amsterdam.

In 1904, he published “Movimiento Intelectual en el Paraguay” (Intellectual Movement in Paraguay), which notes some of the most important personalities of the Spain.

Family

In 1906, Viritao, encouraged by the Paraguayan politician and writer Hérib Campos Cervera, who visited him in Spain, decided to travel to Paraguay.

He stayed in the country and decided to settle down in Paraguay. He married Leticia Godoi Rivarola, daughter of the renowned politician and benefactor Juan Silvano Godoi. they had two sons, Fernán and Rodrigo. 

The museum and library that carries the name of Juan Silvano Godoi became the favorite refuge of Viriato, always devoted to his studies.

He dedicated his life to teaching and the intellectual life, and was teacher of hundreds of Paraguayans that received his influence.

Positions occupied

He was appointed Chief of the National Archive, General Director of the Library and Museum of Fine Arts, additionally, he was a member of the Limits Commission with Bolivia. In 1902, he was appointed the Consul of Paraguay in Spain.

Career in Paraguay

Participation in culture

In 1907, he organized the literary circle “La Colmena” that gathered together an entire group of first class intellectuals, such as: Rafael Barret, Juan E. O'Leary, Manuel Domínguez, Arsenio López Decoud, Modesto Guggiari, Juan Silvano Godoy, Carlos R. Centurión, Fulgencio R. Moreno, Ricardo Brugada (son), Juan Casabianca, Ignacio A. Pane, Ramón V. Caballero and others.

In 1908, he was a conspicuous collaborator in conferences in a lot of popular literary publishing from the time. Since he arrived to Paraguay, the name Viriato was never estranged from the cultural activity in Asunción.

He participated in diverse cultural acts of international disclosure, with Argentina, Brazil, Uruguay, United States, Spain, Italy and Germany.

Since that year to the second decade of the century, his prodigious literary publications were amazing. He was renowned as an important part of the Paraguayan intellectuality. He was known even in foreign circles and gained fame as a wise man.

As the Paraguayan delegate to the Congreso de Bibliografía e Hisoria (Congress of Bibliography and History) in 1916 in Buenos Aires, Argentina, he presented his work “Polibiblión Paraguayo”, a guide of bibliographic indications about Paraguay.

Work

He was editor in chief of the important Magazine of the Paraguayan Institute.

In 1913, Viritao created the Revista Paraguaya (Paraguayan Magazine).    In 1924, he wrote the official inform about “La cultura y escultura en el Paraguay” (The culture and sculpture in Paraguay), presented to the League of Nations.

In 1925, Viritao collaborated with the Revista del Paraguay (Magazine of Paraguay), directed by the investigator and poet Enrique Parodi.

Viritao organized the Segundo Congreso Internacional de Historia y Geografía de América (2nd International Congress of History and Geography of America), in Asunción on October 12, 1926.

In 1930, Viritao published “La Asunción” a magnificent study called “Las comunidades peninsulares en su relación con los levantamientos comuneros americanos y en especial con la Revolución Comunera del Paraguay” (The peninsular communities in their relation with the raising of the American Comuneros and especially with the Revolución in Paraguay).

In 1948, he collaborated with his monograph “La literature en el Paraguay” (The literature in Paraguay) to integrate the great Universal History of Literature, of Prapoline, encyclopedia of XIII volumes. Díaz Pérez was one of the most important figures in the complex time of 1900 in Paraguay.

Last years

He offered more than three hundred conferences.

He gave the classes for more than forty years in the most known educational institutions. His humanist culture, his profound knowledge and inexhaustible intellectual activity made him deserving of the respect of students and pairs.

On August 25, 1958, he died in Asunción.

References

 Cien vidas paraguayas. Carlos Zubizarreta
 Historia de las letras paraguayas. Carlos R. Centurión

1875 births
1958 deaths
People from Madrid
Spanish educators
Spanish emigrants to Paraguay